The 2010 Team Speedway Junior World Championship was the sixth FIM Team Under-21 World Championship season. The final took place on 5 September, 2010 at Rye House Stadium in Rye House, England. It was the first final in Great Britain. The Championship was won by Denmark, who beat Sweden, the defending champions Poland and host team Great Britain. It was first championship not to be won by Poland.

Results 
In the 2010 Final will be the host team Great Britain. Another finalist will be determined in two Qualifying Rounds on May 29 and June 19.

Heat details

Semifinal 1 

29 May 2010
 Plzeň, Plzeň Region
Speedway Track Plzeň – Bory (Length: 365 m)
Referee:  Jesper Stentoft
Jury President:  Boris Kotnjek
References

Semifinal 2 
10 July 2010
 Güstrow, Mecklenburg-Vorpommern
Speedwaystadion Güstrow (Length: 298 m)
Referee:  Krister Gardell
Jury President:  Christian Bouin
References

World Final 
5 September 2010
 Rye House, East of England
Rye House Speedway (Length: 262 m)
Referee:  Marek Wojaczek
Jury President:  Christer Bergstrom
References

See also 
 2010 Speedway World Cup
 2010 Individual Speedway Junior World Championship

References 

2010
World Team Junior